Castlevania: The Adventure is a platform game released for the Game Boy in 1989. It is the first Castlevania title for the system. Castlevania: The Adventure was re-released in color as part of the Konami GB Collection compilations in Japan and Europe. A remake titled Castlevania: The Adventure ReBirth was released as a WiiWare game for the Wii. The original game is included in the Castlevania Anniversary Collection, which was released in 2019.

Gameplay

Set a century after the events of Castlevania III and a century before the events of the original Castlevania, the player controls a descendant of Trevor Belmont and an ancestor of Simon Belmont named Christopher Belmont who goes on a quest to defeat Dracula.

The game consists of four stages, and unlike other Castlevania games, there are no sub-weapons, but hearts are used to restore health. The player has three lives, after which the player must restart the level. Weapons can be upgraded, such as the whip into the chain whip and flame whip, but any enemy damage will downgrade an upgraded weapon. At the end of each level, there is a "primary evil" (boss) to confront. The four bosses are: A knight (who later appears as a normal enemy in stage four), a group of "Fleamen/Igors" from previous installments, a gargoyle, and finally Dracula himself, who turns into a bat when his humanoid form is defeated.  Players can utilize crystals, hearts, and crosses of gold. There is a point counter, and at 10,000 points, a player receives an extra life, and receives one for every 20,000 points after that. Each stage has a time limit in which to complete the level.

Reception

Castlevania: The Adventure received mixed reviews. The game was regarded difficult at times, with long levels and only three lives before playing the second cycle. The graphics were thought to be "competent", the music well-composed with memorable tunes. IGN said it had a basic design, none of the series' staple bosses, and nothing original. Game Informer Tim Turi felt that it was held back by its technical limitations but praised its sound quality.

The biggest criticism of the game was by far the difficulty. While the Castlevania series is known for being very challenging, The Adventure was often lambasted due to being difficult for illegitimate reasons. The most common complaint is that the protagonist, Christopher Belmont, moves far too slowly, causing the game to feel much more sluggish and also making a few platforming sections (the floating bricks in stage one, the bridges in stage two, the spiked floor and wall in stage three, and the moving platforms in stage four) almost impossible. 
The game was also criticized for other poor choices in design; for example, the second stage becomes impossible to beat if the player goes left instead of right on the first set of ropes and goes all the way down the bridge. They will be faced with a dead-end, Belmont will respawn there when he dies, and there is no way to get back up. The only way for the player to continue is to lose all of their lives, which will put them at the beginning of the stage. The third issue many players have is that the enemies are very poorly placed; there are many sections in the first two stages where the player MUST grab an invincibility power-up to avoid getting instantly hit by something they cannot avoid in the following section, and many other sections where it is almost, if not completely impossible to avoid taking damage unless the whip is upgraded. And last, but not least, the fact that Belmont's whip loses its upgrades when he gets hit was considered another unnecessary factor in the game's extreme difficulty.

Time Extension placed The Adventure second last on its list of ranked Castlevania games. It was described that "The gameplay is sluggish, the level design uninspired and the controls painful. Only a decent soundtrack saves this one from the scrapheap."

In June 2006, a ROM hack of the game was created. The hack, simply titled Quick Fix, resolved many issues and criticisms with the game; Christopher Belmont moves at a much more reasonable speed, the whip does not downgrade when Belmont gets hit (however it still downgrades when he dies), and Belmont's hitbox was also slightly improved to prevent instances where he seemingly lands on a platform, but then "slips" off. The creator states that it was "Made on behalf of those who have played [Castlevania] Adventure and hated it due to certain drawbacks" before going on to mention said drawbacks.

In other media
A series of comic books were released in 2005 by IDW Publishing called Castlevania: The Belmont Legacy, which are based on the game.

Notes

References

External links

1989 video games
1980s horror video games
Adventure, The
Game Boy games
Game Boy Color games
Platform games
Single-player video games
Video games developed in Japan
Video game prequels
Virtual Console games
Virtual Console games for Nintendo 3DS